Gibraltar Hill is a hill in the Capital region near   in New South Wales, Australia.

Location and characteristics
The Capital Wind Farm at Bungendore is visible from the hill, and, according to Australian naval officer Stacey Porter, the view makes "a really nice outlook."

History
In 1840, Jackey Jackey created a hide-out on the hill overlooking Bungendore.

The hill has an authority ID of NSW20217.

Geology
The hill is oval in shape and is made of igneous rock.  Granite mined from the hill was used in the construction of buildings in the town of Bungendore.

See also

 Mount Gibraltar
 Gibralter Hill
 List of mountains in New South Wales

References

Mountains of New South Wales
Hills of New South Wales
Mining in New South Wales
Bungendore, New South Wales